Milić Vukašinović (born 9 March 1950) is a Yugoslav musician, the founder of the hard rock band Vatreni Poljubac as well as one-time drummer of the famous Yugoslav rock bands Bijelo Dugme and Indexi.

A rock'n'roll pioneer in the city of Sarajevo where he spent his formative years, Vukašinović is also known for his composing and songwriting work with some of the biggest Yugoslav commercial folk music stars such as Hanka Paldum and Toma Zdravković.

Early life
Born in Belgrade to a father from Andrijevica who held a rank of major in UDBA, infant Vukašinović was brought to Peć in 1953 when his father got reassigned there. After spending five years in Peć, the family moved to Sarajevo.

Career

Early musical activity
Vukašinović started drumming simultaneously to his primary schooling in Sarajevo, joining his first band Plavi Dijamanti in 1963 at the age of thirteen. Formed by guitarist Edo Bogeljić, Plavi Dijamanti were an instrumental cover group — somewhat of an outdated setup since the city and the rest of Yugoslavia had already been experiencing the surging popularity of the vocalist bands. Mostly playing local high school dance parties, their shining moment came in 1964 at the city's very first gitarijada (battle of the bands) held at the Second Sarajevo Gymnasium—a competition they won largely thanks to Vukašinović's memorable drum solo cover of The Shadows' "See You in My Drums".

Vukašinović then switched to Čičak with Zoran Redžić on bass, Mahmut "Paša" Ferović on rhythm guitar, and Dragan Danilović on lead guitar. Čičak folded in 1969.

Kodeksi

During spring 1970, Željko Bebek invited Redžić to join his cover band Kodeksi on a club & bar tour of southern Italy since they immediately needed a new bass player. Redžić in turn brought along his friend and old Čičak bandmate—twenty-year-old Vukašinović—since the struggling Kodeksi that also featured future Bijelo Dugme leader Goran Bregović needed a replacement drummer as well. 

Arriving to a band primarily catering to tourists in the Naples area by playing a mixed commercial repertoire of Eastern European upbeat folk sounds (čoček, kozachok, kolo, etc.) and Top 40 Western English-language hits, Vukašinović encouraged and eventually convinced his new bandmates to turn towards hard rock along the lines of the pioneering music coming out of England epitomized by acts like Led Zeppelin and Black Sabbath. The cover band's new musical shift backfired immediately as they got fired from most of the bars and nightclubs in and around Naples they had regularly been playing up to that point. and eventually returned to Sarajevo.

Move to London
In late summer 1971, twenty-one-year-old Vukašinović decided to relocate to London where he would end up spending the following three years. Finding musical success in England proved elusive as he was quickly reduced to earning a living through menial jobs such as washing dishes in restaurants, unloading lorries, and bussing tables at the recently-opened Hard Rock Cafe near Hyde Park Corner.

Not forgotten by his peers back home in Sarajevo, not long after arriving in London, during late fall 1971, Vukašinović received a telegram offer of taking over the drummer spot in Indexi, an already established band throughout Yugoslavia. However, he decided to decline it, reasoning he wanted to continue trying to make it in London.

By 1973, his girlfriend Vera joined him in London. The pair returned abruptly to Yugoslavia in late 1974 due to the news of the death of Vera's father.

Return to Sarajevo, joining Indexi

Immediately after returning home in late 1974, Vukašinović joined Indexi, recording several singles with them. He notably played drums on the "Bacila je sve niz rijeku" single that was initially met with lukewarm reception, but would eventually, fifteen to twenty years later, become an evergreen hit when Crvena Jabuka covered it in 1991 and director Srđan Dragojević incorporated it in his 1996 hit movie Lepa sela lepo gore.

During late winter 1975, Vukašinović played with the band at their triumphant Skenderija Hall concert in front of 14,000 people. The accomplishment led to a Yugoslavia-wide tour that ended up not as successful as the band struggled to replicate the crowd draw outside of their hometown.

Vukašinović parted ways with Indexi in early fall 1976, dissatisfied over revenue sharing within the band—specifically his own cut of the financial compensation for the upcoming tour of the Soviet Union.

Bijelo Dugme, Vatreni Poljubac and Solo Career
 

In October 1976, Goran Bregović offered Vukašinović the drummer spot in Bijelo Dugme since their regular drummer Ipe Ivandić suddenly got called up for his mandatory military service. Vukašinović immediately accepted and reportedly got YUD20 million to play on the upcoming studio record and the subsequent tour. He thus appeared on their 1976 album Eto! Baš hoću!, but decided to leave the group in 1977 right after the album tour ended.

The same year, 1977, he formed the enthusiastic power trio Vatreni poljubac. In parallel, he started working with Yugoslav commercial folk artists, composing songs for them — in 1979 his song "Voljela sam, voljela" sung by Hanka Paldum became a huge hit. After recording nine studio albums between 1977 and 1986, Vukašinović disbanded Vatreni poljubac choosing to pursue a solo career, recording five albums. After the Yugoslav Wars he released two more albums and took part in Bijelo Dugme’s 2005 farewell tour. In 1997 he entered the Eurovision song contest for Bosnia and Herzegovina with Alma Čardžić with their song "Goodbye". Since November 1997 he's been living in Belgrade where he collaborates with fellow musicians.

In late 2006, he took part in a brief Vatreni poljubac reunion, the focus of which was a concert on 29 December at Belgrade's SKC.

After expressing interest to appear as one of the opening acts at the Rolling Stones concert in Belgrade on 14 July 2007, Vukašinović was booked up until a couple of days before the show. However, at that time a row between him, Stones' management and local concert organizers came to a head and he ended up not playing.

In March 2014, Vukašinović released his ninth solo album entitled Nemoj pjevat'...Ma nemoj. The album was released through City Records.

Personal life
Born in Belgrade, he moved with his family to Peć when he was six years old. In 1963, they moved again, this time to Sarajevo where he spent most of his time until the end of the war in Bosnia and Herzegovina in 1992. He identifies as Yugoslav.

On 1 March 2008 he entered the Veliki brat house as part of the show's second season in celebrity format. He appeared in the same show one year later, and entered again in 2013.

In 2012, the first part of his autobiography titled Seksualno nemoralan tip, filozofsko-psihološki triler: Seks, droga, alkohol i rokenrol was published and released by Beoknjiga.

On 24 July 2018 his daughter, Maja Avdibegović, committed suicide by overdosing on illegal drugs. She was 35.

Discography

Solo albums

Potraži me  (1984)
Hej jaro, jarane  (1986)
Kao nekad  (1992)
Sad ga lomi (1992)
Seksualno nemoralan tip  (2002)
Ima Boga  (2003)
Gleda a ne da  (2005)
Disco Mix 50 hitova Gorana Bregovića  (2006)
Nemoj pjevat'...Ma nemoj  (2014)

with Vatreni Poljubac

studio albums
Oh, što te volim, joj! (1978)
Recept za Rock`n`Roll (1979)
Bez dlake na jeziku (1980)
To je ono pravo (1980)
Živio Rock`n`Roll (1982)
Iz inata (1985)
100% Rock`n`Roll (1986)
Sve će jednom proć` samo neće nikad Rock`n`Roll (1999)
Kad svira Rock`n`Roll (2011)

singles
"Doktor za Rock 'n' Roll" (1978)
"Na vrat na nos i na svoju ruku" (1979)

with Bijelo Dugme

singles
"Goodbye America" (1976)
"Tako ti je mala moja kad ljubi Bosanac" (1976)
"Dosao sam da ti kažem da odlazim" (1976)
"Himna lista Zdravo" (1976)

studio albums
 Eto! Baš hoću! (1976)

with Indexi

singles
"Samo su ruže znale" (1974)
"Pogrešan broj" (1974)
"Didn-da-da" (1974)
"Volim te" (1975)
"Obala pusta, obala vrela" (1975)

References

1950 births
Living people
Musicians from Belgrade
Yugoslav male singers
20th-century Bosnia and Herzegovina male singers
Bosnia and Herzegovina rock singers
Bosnia and Herzegovina rock guitarists
Bosnia and Herzegovina male guitarists
Bosnia and Herzegovina rock drummers
Bosnia and Herzegovina heavy metal musicians
Singers from Belgrade
Big Brother (Serbian TV series)
21st-century Bosnia and Herzegovina male singers